Minosaphaenops is a genus of beetles in the family Carabidae, containing the following species:

 Minosaphaenops croaticus Lohaj & Jalzic, 2009
 Minosaphaenops ollivieri Queinnec, 2008

References

Trechinae